The University of Seoul (UOS) is a municipal public university in Seoul, South Korea. UOS is famous in South Korea for a large number of alumni working as national or municipal government officials. UOS is specialized in urban science and has top-tier programs environmental engineering, taxation, transportation engineering, urban planning and design, landscape architecture, and urban administration.

UOS is a public university funded and supported by the Seoul Metropolitan Government. Academic programs of UOS have been set to support necessities of the Seoul Metropolitan Government. Hence, UOS functions as a think-tank in formulating and supporting the major policy goals of the Seoul Metropolitan Government, along with basic research and education. UOS has a goal of becoming an international center for the urban sciences.

History
The University of Seoul was founded as Kyung Sung Public Agricultural College in 1918 and renamed as University of Seoul in 1987. In 2012, the mayor of Seoul, Park Won-soon, implemented a campaign promise, "Half-priced tuition" as soon as he started his term. The half-priced tuition was initiated in UOS first so that it would drive other universities to decrease their tuition. In 2013, UOS tuition per semester ranged from $915 to $1,441 (two semesters a year, 1,117.3 won/$ in 2013). Because of high quality of education and low tuition of UOS, admission process has been more competitive.

 1918 Founded as Kyung Sung Public Agricultural College
 1956 Promoted to four-year college and renamed Seoul Agricultural College
 1974 Reorganized as Seoul Industrial University
 1981 Renamed Seoul City University
 1987 Renamed as University of Seoul and promoted to comprehensive university (4 colleges and 22 departments)

Faculty and students 
Because the Seoul Metropolitan Government supported 70% of an annual budget, UOS is one of the best value public universities. UOS  has the lowest student-faculty ratio, the highest financial investment per student, and the highest rate of scholarship recipients in South Korea. In addition, most administrative staff in UOS are affiliated in the Seoul Metropolitan Government.

Many UOS students think that they take a lot of financial and educational benefits from the Seoul government, so they feel obligated to participate in  social works. Number of social work volunteers in 2012 was 3,105 and is expected to increase.

Student satisfaction is relatively very high. In 2012, the registration rate of new students was very high (96%) and the withdrawal rate of students was extremely low (0.97%), compared with other universities in Seoul.

Community outreach
UOS has long been providing services for Seoul and citizens of Seoul. In particular, UOS provides a diverse range of training programs for the municipal officials, national government officials, and experts in the public sector. From 1997, UOS provides Seoul citizens with lifelong education in UOS Open University located near the [[Gwanghwa Gate]] in central Seoul. UOS Open University provides a broad range of education programs including languages, technologies, Seoul Study, and various cultural activities. UOS has vocational and educational programs for more than 5,000 Seoulites annually in the Continuing Education Center. The Social Welfare Center located in the main campus provides a wide range of social services for more than 100,000 senior citizens and disabled citizens a year.

Academics

Colleges

Graduate school
The Graduate School has 35 courses for master's degrees and 25 courses for doctoral degrees. In addition, there's specialized graduate schools as follows.
 Graduate School of Science in Taxation
 Graduate School of Design
 Graduate School of Urban Science
 International School of Urban Sciences
 Graduate School of Business Administration
 Graduate School of Engineering
 Graduate School of Education
 Law School

University rankings 

In 2012, UOS was ranked as one of top three among universities that do not have a medical school. According to 2015 report from The Times Higher Education, UOS ranked 7th among all the Korean universities and 49th among all the Asian universities. In another survey, UOS ranked 14th in the Asian midsize universities. UOS was reported the best value public university in Korea, with high financial investment and scholarship amount per student. Students' affinity to the school was ranked in the first place and students' satisfaction is in the second place according to a 2010 survey.

See also
List of national universities in South Korea
List of universities and colleges in South Korea
Education in Korea

References

External links 

  
  

 
Universities and colleges in Seoul
Public universities and colleges in South Korea
Educational institutions established in 1918
1918 establishments in Korea
Dongdaemun District